Junior Turner (born September 2, 1988) is a Canadian football defensive lineman who is currently a free agent. He most recently played for the Toronto Argonauts of the Canadian Football League (CFL). He spent the first nine years of his career with the Calgary Stampeders where he won Grey Cup championships in 2014 and 2018. He played CIS football with the Bishop's Gaiters.

Professional career

Calgary Stampeders
In the CFL’s Amateur Scouting Bureau final rankings, he was ranked as the 12th best player for players eligible in the 2011 CFL Draft, and seventh by players in the Canadian Interuniversity Sport (CIS). Turner was drafted ninth overall in the second round of the 2011 CFL Draft by the Calgary Stampeders. He was later signed to a contract with the Stampeders on May 20, 2011. He played in nine seasons for the Stampeders where he played in 106 regular season games and recorded 154 defensive tackles, 17 sacks, and one forced fumble. He was released by the Stampeders on January 29, 2020.

Toronto Argonauts
On October 6, 2021, Turner signed with the Toronto Argonauts. He played in four regular season games where he had eight defensive tackles and one sack. He became a free agent upon the expiry of his contract on February 8, 2022.

References

External links
Toronto Argonauts bio
Calgary Stampeders bio

1988 births
Living people
Canadian football defensive linemen
Bishop's Gaiters football players
Calgary Stampeders players
Players of Canadian football from Ontario
Canadian football people from Toronto
Toronto Argonauts players